Naked Amazon is a 1954 Brazilian adventure film directed by Zygmunt Sulistrowski. It was entered into the 1954 Cannes Film Festival.

Cast
 Monique Jaubert Sulistrowski
 Andrea Bayard
 Dercy Gonçalves
 Angela Maria
 Jeffrey Mitchell
 Richard Olizar
 José Osorio

References

External links

1954 films
1950s Portuguese-language films
1954 adventure films
Brazilian adventure films